Kudryavtsevo is a rural locality (a village) in Muromtsevskoye Rural Settlement, Sudogodsky District, Vladimir Oblast, Russia. The population was 7 as of 2010.

Geography 
Kudryavtsevo is located 17 km southwest of Sudogda (the district's administrative centre) by road. Klavdino is the nearest rural locality.

References 

Rural localities in Sudogodsky District